Anchorage Island is an island lying  south-east of Lagoon Island in the Léonie Islands, off the southeast coast of Adelaide Island. Discovered by the French Antarctic Expedition (FrAE), 1908–10. Named by the British Graham Land Expedition (BGLE) under Rymill, who visited the island in February 1936.

See also 
 List of Antarctic and sub-Antarctic islands

References 

Islands of Adelaide Island